The Independent Garden Center Show (IGC Show) is held every year since 2007 in Chicago, IL, in the United States.

History 

The IGC Show was created by Jeff and Cheryl Morey, co-directors of Garden Centers of America (GCA) and publishers of IGC Magazine. The first IGC Show was held in 2007, at Chicago's Navy Pier.

In 2014, IGC East convened at the Gaylord National Resort and Convention Center in National Harbor, MD. In 2015, IGC East relocated to the Baltimore Convention Center in Baltimore, MD. In 2016, the East Coast event relocated to the Valley Forge Casino Resort.

IGC Show 2018 reconvened at Chicago's Navy Pier. In 2019, citing ongoing construction at the Navy Pier, the show was moved to McCormick Place.

IGC Show 2019 was hosted in the Lakeside Center at McCormick Place.

Description 
The IGC Show is one of the largest shows for independent garden center owners, managers and buyers. The show is not open to large retail chain competitors or the general public.

The IGC Show presents garden center products available at wholesale. It is a juried show so every exhibiting company has been screened to ensure the products offered for sale are relevant to independent garden centers.

In addition to the trade show, the IGC Show hosts an educational conference on topics relevant to garden centers, such as customer service, inventory, signage, social media, store design, advertising, and more. Each day before the trade show opens, a keynote speaker starts the day.

The IGC Show provides a networking area.  "Shop Talk" Retail Discussions, facilitated by a moderator, provide discussion on topics including marketing strategies, minimum wage increases, and younger customers .

IGC show provides a special area of vendor exhibits for companies that are new to the IGC Show and garden center industry. The New Product Zone features new products and plants submitted by vendors all across the show's exhibit space.

The 2019 show unveiled the IGC Retail Lab, a retail symposium and interactive design forum. It is designed to help IGC owners turn their stores into gathering spaces that capitalize on the most popular consumer trends.

Contest 
In 2017, the Best New Product and the Best New Plant awards contest was started.  Garden center retailers voted for their favorite new products and plants.

Best new product 

 2017 - first place  Kreative Gardens of Miami, FL; second place  went to Potwheelz Garden Dolly of Gulf Breeze, FL. 
 2018 - first place  TrashCan of Portsmouth, NH; the second place to Grass Flip Flops of Westlake Village, CA. 
 2019 - first-place  Complete Grow Kits from A Pot for Pot of Oakland, CA; second place Fir Needle Products from Bedrock Tree Farm of Wakefield, RI.

Best new plant 

 2017 - first place  Regal Petticoat Maple from Sester Farms in Gresham, OR; the second place  'Gold Breeze' Zebra Grass from Hortech in Spring Lake, MI.
 2018 - the first place  Hollywood Hibiscus from J Berry Nursery of Grand Saline, TX; the second place Endless Summer Hydrangeas Summer Crush from Bailey Nurseries of St. Paul, MN.
 2019 - first-place Best New Plant plant arrangement of Yellow Star, Large Capitata Maroon and Tropiflora from Russell's Bromeliads of Clermont, FL; the second-place  First Editions Iceberg Alley Sageleaf Willow from Bailey of St. Paul, MN.

Previous shows 
 2019 to 2020:  McCormick Place
2017 to 2018: - Navy Pier
 2016 -, Valley Forge Casino Resort;  Navy Pier
 2015 - Baltimore Convention Center;, Navy Pier
 2014 - Gaylord National Resort and Convention Center;, Navy Pier 
 2007 to 2013 - Navy Pier r

Keynote speakers 

 2019 – Mark Bellingr
 2019 – Jeff Baxter
 2019 – Dr. Bridget Behe, Professor of Horticultural Marketing at Michigan State University
 2018 – Bob Negen, retail speaker
 2018 – Daymond John
 2018 – Dr. Charlie Hall, Professor and Ellison Chair in International Floriculture at Texas A&M University
 2017 – Bob Phibbs, CEO of The Retail Doctor
 2017 – Robert J. O'Neill, 
 2017 – John Stanley, international IGC retail consultant of John Stanley Associates
 2016 – Corey Bordine, Consultant for MonkeyBar Management and former president of Bordine Nursery

 2016 – Mike Ditka,
 2016 – Amanda Thomsen, Kiss My Aster Garden Blogger
 2016 – Bruce Crawford, Director of Rutgers' Gardens, Rutgers University's arboretum & public garden
 2016 – Jonathan Bardzik, Chef & Garden Cookbook Author
 2016 – John Tierney, The New York Times Science Columnist
 2015 – Martha Stewart
 2015 – Marcus Lemonis
 2015 – Robert Hendrickson, Business Story Developer for Next New Planet, Marketing Service Provider for The Garden Center Group, and IGC Magazine columnist
 2015 – Lloyd Traven, President of Peace Tree Farm
 2015 – Ernest Wertheim,  Principal of Wertheim, Van Der Ploeg, & Klemeyer
 2014 – Martha Stewart
 2014 – Corey Bordine
 2014 – Willie Degel
 2014 – Henry Hutcheson, President of Family Business USA and IGC Magazine columnist
 2014 – Peter Shankman
 2013 – Taniya Nayak, Designer, TV Personality and Host of HGTV's House Hunters on Vacation

 2013 – Peter Shankman
 2013 – John Stanley,  IGC Magazine columnist
 2012 – Rick Baylessf
 2012 – Corey Bordine
 2012 – Joe Lamp’l, Founder of The Joe Gardener Company, Garden Writer, Author and Host of GardenSmart and Fresh from the Garden
 2012 – Joseph Pine, Co-founder of Strategic Horizons and Starizon Studio, and Co-author of The Experience Economy: Work is Theater & Every Business a Stage
 2011 – P. Allen Smith
 2011 – Paco Underhill, Founder of Envirosell, Author and Professional Speaker
 2011 – Larry Winget
 2010 – Howard Bloom,
 2010 – Corey Bordine

 2010 – Jamie Durie
 2010 – Josh Viertel, President of Slow Food USA
 2009 – Robert Hendrickson, Business Story Developer for Next New Planet, Marketing Service Provider for The Garden Center Group, and IGC Magazine columnist
 2009 – John Moore, Marketing executive for Starbucks and Whole Foods
 2009 – Dr. Patrick Moore, Co-founder of Greenpeace
 2008 – Corey Bordine
 2008 – Diarmuid Gavin, President of Diarmuid Gavin Designs
 2008 – Dick Hayne, CEO of Urban Outfitters
 2008 – John Kinsella, Managing Director of Terrain
 2008 – John Stanley
 2007 – Susie Coelho
 2007 – Leatrice Eiseman, Executive Director of Pantone Color Institute
 2007 – Charles Fishman, Author of The Wal-Mart Effect
 2007 – Robyn Waters, Author of The Trendmaster’s Guide

Concerts at IGS shows 
 2019: Jefferson Starship
2018: The Marshall Tucker Band
2017: Blue Öyster Cult
 2016: REO Speedwagon; Gloria Gaynor
 2015: Gin Blossoms
 2014: Don Felder
 2013: 38 Special
 2012: Dennis DeYoung, Music of Styx
 2011: Lou Gramm
 2010: America
 2009: Charlie Daniels Band
 2008: Kansas
 2007: Rick Derringer

Founders 

 Jeff Morey and Cheryl Morey 
 IGC Magazine 
 Garden Centers of America (GCA)

References 

Trade shows in the United States